Charles Félix Henri Rabou (6 September 1803 – 1 February 1871) was a 19th-century French writer, novelist and journalist.

Biography 
The son of a military sub-intendant, he studied at the collège Henri IV before attending law classes at the Faculty of Dijon. Back in Paris with his degree in law, he turned away from the bar in favor of literature. First a journalist for La Quotidienne, Le Messager des Chambres, Le Nouvelliste, le Journal de Paris, La Charte de 1830, he held political and literary chronicles, then in 1832 launched La Cour d'Assise, to be published until 1834.

Publication de Balzac 
Director of the prestigious Revue de Paris which he helped establish, he befriended Honoré de Balzac whose novels he published in the pages of his paper. Mutual trust was such that Balzac entrusted him with the task to complete some unfinished novels after his death:  (1854),  (1855),  (1855),   (1856), a task Rabou performed honestly but that was coldly greeted by the critics.

He was falsely accused of being Balzac's ghostwriter. Charles Rabou continued to produce great works of literature that deserve to be rediscovered.

Works 
Source:

Collections 
1832:  (with Honoré de Balzac and Philarète Chasles):
 Sara la danseuse
 Tobias Guarnerius
 Les Regrets
 Le Ministère public

Novels 
1831: Le Mannequin (1831)
1839: Les Tribulations et métamorphoses posthumes de maître Fabricius, peintre liégeois (reprinted in 1860)
1840: Louison d'Arquien 
1842: Le Capitaine Lambert 
1845: La Reine d'un jour 
1846: Madame de Chaumergis
1845: L'Allée des veuves 
1849: Le Cabinet noir. Les Frères de la mort
1857: La Fille sanglante
1858: Le Marquis de Vulpiano 
1860: Les Grands danseurs du Roi

Continuation of Balzac 
1854: Scènes de la vie politique. Le Député d'Arcis 
1854: Le Comte de Sallenauve 
1855: La Famille Beauvisage 
1855: Les Petits bourgeois, scènes de la vie parisienne

Historical essay 
1860: La Grande Armée

Bibliography 
  Charles Rabou on wikisource
 Jacques Goimard et Roland Stragliati (éds.), Histoires de fantômes, éd. Presses Pocket, 1977
 Jacques Goimard et Roland Stragliati (éds.), La Grande Anthologie du fantastique, t.2, éd. Omnibus, 1996
 Florian Balduc (éd.),Fantaisies Hoffmaniennes, Editions Otrante, 2016

References 

19th-century French novelists
19th-century French journalists
French male journalists
Writers from Paris
1803 births
1871 deaths
19th-century French male writers